Ryedale School, opened in 1953, is a coeducational secondary school located in Beadlam, North Yorkshire, England.

The school provides for pupils aged 11 to 16, and has a capacity enrolment of 750.

The school achieves higher than average GCSE results. In 2012 the school was inspected by Ofsted and was rated Grade 1 (outstanding) for overall effectiveness.

The school has represented both the County and Region at sport, music and interpretive dance; including National Youth Orchestras. Every year the school performs a carol service in the Church of All Saints, Helmsley.

Previously a community school administered by North Yorkshire County Council, in February 2021 Ryedale School converted to academy status.

References

External links
Ryedale School
Rydale School, Ofsted 2010 Interim Assessment statement (pdf download required). Retrieved 25 November 2011

Secondary schools in North Yorkshire
Educational institutions established in 1953
1953 establishments in England
Academies in North Yorkshire